The Bomb is a 1909 novel by Frank Harris based around the Haymarket affair.

Further reading 

 Book Review Digest 1909

External links 

 Full text in Google Books

1909 novels
Books about anarchism
English-language books
Haymarket affair